Raju Murugan is a writer, journalist turned filmmaker from Tiruvarur. His works include Vattiyum Muthalum, Ondru and Gypsy, all of which were published in Ananda Vikatan. He made his directorial debut with Cuckoo (2014). His second film, Joker, was awarded the Best Feature Film in Tamil award at the 64th National Film Awards. He worked as an assistant to Lingusamy for 3 years.

Filmography 
 As director

 As lyricist
Laali Laali (Theeran Adhigaaram Ondru)
Aara Thedum, Nellu Vaasam (Vellai Yaanai)
Thala Kodhum (Jai Bhim)
Veesum Kaathodadhaan (Power Paandi)
Madura Veeran (Viruman)

Books

References

External links 

Tamil film directors
Living people
Journalists from Tamil Nadu
Tamil-language writers
Tamil writers
Tamil screenwriters
21st-century Indian film directors
Film directors from Tamil Nadu
Screenwriters from Tamil Nadu
Year of birth missing (living people)